Piluoge (697–748), posthumous name King Guiyi, was the founder of the Nanzhao kingdom in what is now Yunnan, China. He reigned from 728 or 738 through 748.

Issue and Ancestry

Piluoge was the son of Shengluopi and was succeeded by his son Geluofeng.

See also
Dali City
Khun Borom
Nanzhao
Pyu city-states
Tang dynasty

References

697 births
748 deaths
8th-century Chinese monarchs
Nanzhao